Super Don Quix-ote (スーパードンキホーテ) is an arcade laserdisc video game released by Universal in 1984. In it, the player controls the knight Don as he attempts to rescue a princess from an evil witch.

Super Don Quix-ote is loosely based on the novel Don Quixote, while the laserdisc format is similar to other laserdisc games such as Dragon's Lair and Space Ace. The major difference that set Super Don Quix-ote apart is an overlaid icon indicating the time and direction of each correct quick time event input, whereas all other laserdisc games at the time gave no indication of correct moves, except an occasional "flash" incorporated into the animation itself.

Plot
The game is loosely inspired by its namesake, Don Quixote, and features a heroic young knight named Don on a quest to save his love, the fair princess Isabella, who has been kidnapped by a wicked witch for human sacrifice to a demon. Don is accompanied on his travels by a donkey (based on Rocinante, the original Don Quixote's horse), and a fat little man named Sancho (based on Don Quixote's trusty sidekick Sancho Panza). 

The closest parallel to the original tale is a scene in which Don fights a giant at a windmill. However, the rest of the game pits him against a mummy, a dragon, skeletons, demons, giant snakes, flying electric jellyfish, an animated totem pole, the witch's daughter, and other scenarios with no relation to the original story. The game ends when Don kills the witch and rescues Isabella, and they escape the witch's castle as it is destroyed.

Universal System 1
Super Don Quix-ote was the first and only game released for the Universal System 1, a standardized laserdisc video game system. Several other games were planned for this cabinet, but were never released: Adventure in Middle Earth, Adventure Mr. Do!, Time Slip, Circus Circus, Space Dracula, and Wilderness Kingdom.

Another laserdisc game from Universal following a similar flashing quick-time event format was Captain Zapp, which had a motorbike vehicular combat theme. It was the only laserdisc game to be demonstrated at London's Associated Leisure Preview '86 (Arcadia '86) show in October 1985.

Reception
In Japan, Game Machine listed Super Don Quix-ote on their December 15, 1984 issue as being the most-successful upright arcade unit of the month.

Computer and Video Games magazine gave it a generally positive review in December 1984, stating the "movements of all the characters are very smooth and beautifully depicted" with praise for the arrows and signs; though the reviewer didn't think the game "is as much fun" as Dragon's Lair, the review said Don Quix-ote is "a lot less frustrating and should be a real catch in the arcades." Mike Roberts gave it a highly positive review in the April 1985 issue of Computer Gamer magazine, calling it the "latest masterpiece" laserdisc game and stating that it improves on Dragon's Lair and Space Ace in terms of the graphics and playability, with the flashing hints making the gameplay clearer and less confusing than earlier laserdisc games.

References

External links

Super Don Quix-ote at Gaming-History

1984 video games
Arcade video games
Arcade-only video games
Fantasy video games
Full motion video based games
LaserDisc video games
Single-player video games
Video game clones
Video games developed in Japan
Video games about witchcraft
Works based on Don Quixote